United Nations Security Council Resolution 2032 was unanimously adopted on  December 22 2011 after recalling resolution 1889 (2009). The Council also demanded that Sudan and South Sudan urgently finalize the establishment of the Abyei Area Administration and Police Service in accordance with previous agreements, urging them to make use of the mechanisms that had been developed to resolve outstanding issues related to the borders and the demilitarized zone.

See also 
List of United Nations Security Council Resolutions 2001 to 2100

References

External links
Text of the Resolution at undocs.org

 2032
2011 in Sudan
 2032
December 2011 events